Vismia is a genus of flowering plants in the family Hypericaceae. Members of the genus are small trees and shrubs found in tropical and subtropical areas of Central America and South America.
Including the countries of Belize, Bolivia, Brazil, Colombia, Costa Rica, Ecuador, El Salvador, French Guiana, Guatemala, Guyana, Honduras, Mexico, Nicaragua, Panamá, Peru, Suriname, Trinidad-Tobago and Venezuela.

Like many members of the Hypericaceae, these plants contain xanthonoids.

The genus name of Vismia is in honour of Gérard de Visme (c. 1725 – c. 1797), a French and English merchant in Lisbon, Portugal. 
It was first described and published in Fl. Lusit. Bras. Spec. on page 51 in 1788.

Known species
Plants of the World Online accepts 48 species;

References

 
Malpighiales genera
Plants described in 1788
Flora of Mexico
Flora of Central America
Flora of northern South America
Flora of western South America
Flora of Brazil